The Order of 9 September 1944 was an Order of Merit of the Kingdom of Bulgaria from 1945 to 1946, and of the People's Republic of Bulgaria from 1946 to 1990. It commemorated the Bulgarian coup d'état of 1944, it came in three classes, had both a civil and military division and was awarded for services connected with the Army revolt of 9 September 1944 and the formation of the People's Republic, to civilians for service to the government and in wartime to officers and leaders of the People's Army for courage and leadership.

References
http://www.medals.org.uk/bulgaria/peoples-republic/bulgaria-pr002.htm
Todor Petrov: Bulgarian Orders and Medals 1878–2005. Military Publishing House Ltd., Sofia 2005, S. 208–212.
Paul Ohm Hieronymussen: Handbuch Europäischer Orden in Farbe. Universitas Verlag, Berlin 1966, S. 158.

Orders, decorations, and medals of Bulgaria